Mihal or Mihál is a surname. Notable people with the surname include:

Dzianis Mihal (born 1985), Belarusian rower
Joe Mihal (1916–1979), American football player
Jozef Mihál (born 1965), Slovak politician and tax consultant
Köse Mihal (13th century – c. 1340), Byzantine emir

See also
Mihal (given name)